Throwin' Down is the 6th studio album by Rick James, released in 1982 via the Gordy imprint of Motown Records. It peaked at No. 13 on the Billboard 200. Although not as popular as Street Songs, Throwin' Down is certified gold by the RIAA. It was nominated for an American Music Award for Favorite Soul/R&B Album.

Production
Michael Walden, Roy Ayers, and Grace Slick appear on the album.

Critical reception
Robert Christgau wrote: "Stealing his licks from G. Clinton & Co. (or maybe himself, who cares anymore?), he's the nearest thing to a pop musician in the rock and roll sense that today's black charts—not to mention today's white charts—can offer." The Washington Post wrote that "the musical settings are clumsy reworkings of Parliament's funk and the Temptations' psychedelic soul."

Track listing
All tracks composed by Rick James, except where noted.

Side A
"Dance Wit' Me" 7:16
"Money Talks" 4:50
"Teardrops" 4:49
"Throwdown" 3:17

Side B
"Standing on the Top" (with The Temptations) 3:51
"Hard to Get" 4:07
"Happy" (with Teena Marie) 5:29 
"She Blew My Mind (69 Times)" 4:11
"My Love" (James, Le Roi Johnson) 2:53

2014 digital remaster bonus tracks / 2014 Complete Motown Albums bonus tracks
 "Standing on the Top" (Long Version) - 9:50
 "Hard to Get" (12" Instrumental) - 4:12
 "She Blew My Mind (69 Times)" (12" Extended Mix) - 6:30
 "She Blew My Mind (69 Times)" (12" Instrumental) - 7:28

Personnel
Rick James - vocals, guitars, bass guitar, harmonica, keyboards, synthesizers, Linn Drum programming, percussion
Daniel LeMelle - flute, saxophone, trumpet, string synthesizers, backing vocals
Levi Ruffin, Jr. - electric and acoustic piano, synthesizers, backing vocals
John McFee, Tom McDermott - guitars
Erskine Williams - piano
Oscar Alston - bass guitar, backing vocals
Lanise Hughes, Narada Michael Walden, Paul Hines - drums, percussion
Nate Hughes - percussion, handclaps, backing vocals
Roy Ayers, Donny Keider - vibraphone
Teena Marie - Duet Lead vocals on Happy.
Grace Slick, Jean Carn, Julia Tillman Waters, Lawrence Hilton-Jacobs, Maxine Willard Waters, Patti Brooks, Tabby Johnson, Diane Nixon, Jeri Fields - backing vocals
Moses Johnson, JoAnne McDuffe, Lisa Sarna - handclaps, backing vocals
Aaron Dublin, "Bi"g John Main, "Jennifer", Ronald Byrd - handclaps
Karat Faye - Engineer @ Record Plant L.A.

Certifications

References

1982 albums
Gordy Records albums
Rick James albums
Albums produced by Rick James